Captain Kidd (1645–1701) was a Scottish sailor who was tried and executed for piracy.

Captain Kidd may also refer to:
 Captain Kidd (film), a 1945 film starring Charles Laughton
 "Captain Kidd" (song), an English song about Captain Kidd
 Captain Kidd, Jr., a 1919 American silent film
 'Captain Kidd' apple, a red mutation of the 'Kidd's Orange Red' apple
 Captain Kidd (pub), a pub in Wapping named after the Scottish sailor
Captain Jefferson Kidd, fictional character in News of the World (film)